A GPS tracking unit, geotracking unit, satellite tracking unit, or simply tracker is a navigation device normally on a vehicle, asset, person or animal that uses satellite navigation to determine its movement and determine its WGS84  UTM  geographic position (geotracking) to determine its location. Satellite tracking devices send special satellite signals that are processed by a receiver.

Locations are stored in the tracking unit or transmitted to an Internet-connected device using the cellular network (GSM/GPRS/CDMA/LTE  or SMS), radio, or satellite modem embedded in the unit or WiFi work worldwide.

GPS antenna size limits tracker size, often smaller than a half-dollar (diameter 30.61 mm). In 2020 tracking is a $2 billion business plus military-in the gulf war 10% or more targets used trackers. Virtually every cellphone tracks its movements.
Tracks can be map displayed in real time, using GPS tracking software and devices with GPS capability.

Architecture
A GPS "track me" essentially contains a GPS module that receives the GPS signal and calculates the coordinates. For data loggers, it contains large memory to store the coordinates. Data pushers additionally contain a GSM/GPRS/CDMA/LTE modem to transmit this information to a central computer either via SMS or GPRS in form of IP packets. Satellite-based GPS tracking units will operate anywhere on the globe using satellite technology such as GlobalStar or Iridium. They do not require a cellular connection.

Types
There are three types of GPS trackers, though most GPS-equipped phones can work in any of these modes depending on the mobile applications installed:

Data loggers
GPS loggers log the position of the device at regular intervals in its internal memory. GPS loggers may have either a memory card slot, or internal flash memory card and a USB port. Some act as a USB flash drive, which allows downloading the track log data for further computer analysis. The track list or point of interest list may be in GPX, KML, NMEA or other format.

Most digital cameras save the time a photo was taken. Provided the camera clock is reasonably accurate or used GPS as its time source, this time can be correlated with GPS log data, to provide an accurate location. This can be added to the Exif metadata in the picture file. Cameras with a GPS receiver built in can directly produce such a geotagged photograph.

In some private investigation cases, data loggers are used to keep track of a target vehicle. The private investigator need not follow the target too closely, and always has a backup source of data.

Data pushers
A data pusher is the most common type of GPS tracking unit, used for asset tracking, personal tracking and vehicle tracking systems. Virtually every cell phone is in this mode per user agreement, even if shut off or disabled storing the data for future transmission.

Also known as a "GPS beacon", this kind of device push (i.e. "sends"), at regular intervals, the position of the device as well as other information like speed or altitude to a determined server, that can store and analyze the data instantly.

A GPS navigation device and a mobile phone sit side-by-side in the same box, powered by the same battery. At regular intervals, the phone sends a text message via SMS or GPRS, containing the data from the GPS receiver. Newer GPS-integrated smartphones running GPS tracking software can turn the phone into a data pusher (or logger) device. As of 2009, open source and proprietary applications are available for common Java ME enabled phones, iPhone, Android, Windows Mobile, and Symbian.

Most 21st-century GPS trackers provide data "push" technology, enabling sophisticated GPS tracking in business environments, specifically organizations that employ a mobile workforce, such as a commercial fleet. Typical GPS tracking systems used in commercial fleet management have two core parts: location hardware (or tracking device) and tracking software. This combination is often referred to as an Automatic Vehicle Location system. The tracking device is most often hardwired installed in the vehicle, connected to the CAN-bus, ignition system switch, battery. It allows collection of extra data, which is later transferred to the GPS tracking server. There it is available for viewing, in most cases via a website accessed over the Internet, where fleet activity can be viewed live or historically using digital maps and reports.

GPS tracking systems used in commercial fleets are often configured to transmit location and telemetry input data at a set update rate or when an event (door open/close, auxiliary equipment on/off, geofence border cross) triggers the unit to transmit data. Live GPS tracking used in commercial fleets generally refers to systems that update regularly at one-minute, two-minute or five-minute intervals while the ignition status is on. Some tracking systems combine timed updates with heading change triggered updates.

GPS tracking solutions such as Telematics 2.0, an IoT based telematics technology for the automotive industry, are being used by mainstream commercial auto insurance companies.

Data pullers
GPS data pullers are also known as "GPS transponders". Unlike data pushers that send the position of the devices at regular intervals (push technology), these devices are always on, and can be queried as often as required (pull technology). This technology is not in widespread use, but an example of this kind of device is a computer connected to the Internet and running gpsd.

These can often be used in the case where the location of the tracker will only need to be known occasionally (e.g. placed in property that may be stolen, or that does not have a constant source of energy to send data on a regular basis, like freight or containers.)

Data Pullers are coming into more common usage in the form of devices containing a GPS receiver and a cell phone which, when sent a special SMS message reply to the message with their location.

Covert GPS trackers
Covert GPS trackers contain the same electronics as regular GPS trackers but are constructed in such a way as to appear to be an everyday object. One use for covert GPS trackers is for power tool protection; these devices can be concealed within power tool boxes and traced if theft occurs.

Applications
The applications of GPS trackers include:

Personal tracking
 Race control: in some sports, such as gliding, participants are required to carry a tracker. In particular, this allows race officials to know if the participants are cheating, taking unexpected shortcuts, and how far apart they are. This use was illustrated in the movie Rat Race.
 Law enforcement: an arrested suspect out on bail may have to wear a GPS tracker, usually an ankle monitor, as a bail condition. GPS tracking may also be ordered for persons subject to a restraining order.
 Espionage/surveillance: a tracker on a person or vehicle allows movements to be tracked.
 Vehicle tracking: some people use GPS Trackers to monitor activity of their own vehicle, especially in the event of a vehicle being used by a friend or family member.
 GPS personal tracking devices are used in the care of the elderly and vulnerable, and can be used to track small children who may get into danger. Some devices can send text alerts to carers if the wearer moves into an unexpected place. Some devices allow users to call for assistance, and optionally allow designated carers to locate the user's position, typically within five to ten meters. Their use helps promote independent living and social inclusion for the elderly. Devices often incorporate either one-way otwo-way voice communication. Some devices also allow the user to call several phone numbers using pre-programmed speed dial buttons. Trials using GPS personal tracking devices for people living with dementia are underway in several countries. Text and voice communication is usually provided by a connection to mobile telephony, but GPS devices are available that use satellite communications, always available even if out of mobile telephone range.
 Some Internet Web 2.0 pioneers have created their own personal web pages that show their position constantly, and in real time, on a map within their website. These usually use data push from a GPS enabled cell phone or a personal GPS tracker.
 Sports: the movements of a ramblers, cyclists, and so on, can be tracked. Statistics such as instantaneous and average speed, and distance travelled, are logged. In the rugby union Six Nations Championship, all players wear trackers, sewn into their shirts. Some rugby clubs also use GPS units on their players. The England Rugby Union team uses GPS.
 Adventure sports: GPS tracking devices such as the SPOT Satellite Messenger are available to allow the position of a person to be tracked. In particular, this allows rescue personnel to locate the carrier. These devices also allow the carrier to send messages and emergency alerts, even when out of cellular telephone range.
 Monitoring employees: GPS-handled tracking devices with a built-in cellphone are used to monitor employees by various companies, especially those engaged in fieldwork.
 Lone Workers : It is ideal for improving the safety of your employees working in distant, isolated work sites. Maintenance workers, forestry, mining, and employees in similar fields may be required to work in remote areas without any contact nearby, in such scenarios the risk of their well-being increases

Asset tracking

Solar Powered: the advantage of some solar powered units is that they have much more power over their lifetime than battery-powered units. This gives them the advantage of reporting their position and status much more often than battery units which need to conserve  energy to extend their life. Some wireless solar-powered units, such as the RailRider can report more than 20,000 times per year and work indefinitely on solar power, eliminating the need to change batteries.

Aircraft tracking

Aircraft can be tracked either by ADS-B (primarily airliners and General Aviation aircraft with ADS-B-out enabled transponder), or by FLARM data packets picked up by a network of ground stations (primarily used by General Aviation aircraft, gliders and UAVs), both of which are data pushers. ADS-B is to be superseded by ADS-C, a data puller.

Animal tracking

Animal monitoring (GPS wildlife tracking): when put on a wild animal (e.g. in a GPS collar), it allows scientists to study the animal's activities and migration patterns. Vaginal implant transmitters mark the location where pregnant females give birth. Animal tracking collars may also be put on domestic animals, to locate them in case they get lost.

Legislation

Australian law
There are no Australian Federal Laws for surveillance and GPS tracker legality.
However, most states have statutes covering the use and restrictions of tracking devices used for surveillance.

The below states have formal statutes. At present, only Queensland and Tasmania do not have legislation.

United States law
In the United States, the use of GPS trackers by government authorities is limited by the 4th Amendment to the United States Constitution. So police, for example, usually require a search warrant. While police have placed GPS trackers in vehicles without a warrant, this usage was questioned in court in early 2009.

Use by private citizens is regulated in some states, such as California, where California Penal Code Section 637.7 states: 
(a) No person or entity in this state shall use an electronic tracking device to determine the location or movement of a person. 
(b) This section shall not apply when the registered owner, lesser, or lessee of a vehicle has consented to the use of the electronic tracking device with respect to that vehicle.
(c) This section shall not apply to the lawful use of an electronic tracking device by a law enforcement agency.
(d) As used in this section, "electronic tracking device" means any device attached to a vehicle or other movable thing that reveals its location or movement by transmission of electronic signals.
(g) A violation of this section is a misdemeanor.
(f) A violation of this section by a person, business, firm, company, association, partnership, or corporation licensed under Division 3 (commencing with Section 5000) of the Business and Professions Code shall constitute grounds for revocation of the license issued to that person, business, firm, company, association, partnership, or corporation, pursuant to the provisions that provide for the revocation of the license as set forth in Division 3 (commencing with Section 5000) of the Business and Professions Code.

Note that 637.7 pertains to all electronic tracking devices, and does not differentiate between those that rely on GPS technology or not. As the laws catch up with the times, it is plausible that all 50 states will eventually enact laws similar to those of California. 

Other laws, like the common law invasion of privacy tort as well as state criminal wiretapping statutes (for example, the wiretapping statute of the Commonwealth of Massachusetts, which is extremely restrictive) potentially cover the use of GPS tracking devices by private citizens without consent of the individual being so tracked. Privacy can also be a problem when people use the devices to track the activities of a loved one. GPS tracking devices have also been put on religious statues to track the whereabouts of the statue if stolen.

In 2009, debate ensued over a Georgia proposal to outlaw hidden GPS tracking, with an exception for law enforcement officers but not for private investigators. See Georgia HB 16 - Electronic tracking device; location of person without consent (2009).

United Kingdom law
The law in the UK has not specifically addressed the use of GPS trackers, but several laws may affect the use of this technology as a surveillance tool.

Data Protection Act 1998

It is quite clear that if client instructions (written or digitally transmitted) that identify a person and a vehicle are combined with a tracker, the information gathered by the tracker becomes personal data as defined by the Data Protection Act 1998. The document “What is personal data? – A quick reference guide” published by the Information Commissioner's Office (ICO) makes clear that data identifying a living individual is personal data. If a living individual can be identified from the data, with or without additional information that may become available, is personal data.

Identifiability

An individual is 'identified' if distinguished from other members of a group. In most cases, an individual's name, together with some other information, will be sufficient to identify them, but a person can be identified even if their name is not known. Start by looking at the means available to identify an individual and the extent to which such means are readily available to you.

Does the data 'relate to' the identifiable living individual, whether in personal or family life, business or profession?

Relates to means: Data which identifies an individual, even without an associated name, may be personal data which is processed to learn or record something about that individual, or the processing of information that affects the individual. Therefore, data may 'relate to' an individual in several different ways.

Is the data 'obviously about a particular individual? 

Data 'obviously about' an individual will include their medical history, criminal record, record of work, or their achievements in a sporting activity. Data that is not 'obviously about' a particular individual may include information about their activities. Data such as personal bank statements or itemised telephone bills will be personal data about the individual operating the account or contracting for telephone services. Where data is not 'obviously about' an identifiable individual it may be helpful to consider whether the data is being processed, or could easily be processed, to learn, record or decide something about an identifiable individual. Information may be personal data where the aim, or an incidental consequence, of the processing, is that one learns or records something about an identifiable individual, or the processing could affect an identifiable individual. Data from a Tracker would be to identify the individual or their activities. It is therefore personal data within the meaning of the Data Protection Act 1998.

Any individual who wishes to gather personal data must be registered with the Information Commissioner's Office (ICO) and have a DPA number. It is a criminal offense to process data and not have a DPA number.

Trespass

It may be a civil trespass for an individual to deploy a tracker on another's car. But in the OSC's annual inspection, the OSC's Chief Surveillance Commissioner Sir Christopher Rose stated "putting an arm into a wheel arch or under the frame of a vehicle is straining the concept of trespass".

However, entering a person's private land to deploy a tracker is clearly a trespass which is a civil tort.

Prevention of Harassment Act 1997

At times, the public misinterprets surveillance, in all its forms, as stalking. Whilst there is no specific legislation to address this kind of harassment, a long-term pattern of persistent and repeated efforts at contact with a particular victim is generally considered stalking.

The Protection of Freedoms Act 2012 created two new offenses of stalking by inserting new sections 2A and 4A into the PHA 1997. The new offences which came into force on 25 November 2012, are not retrospective. Section 2A (3) of the PHA 1997 sets out examples of acts or omissions which, in particular circumstances, are ones associated with stalking. Examples are: following a person, watching or spying on them, or forcing contact with the victim through any means, including social media.

Such behavior curtails a victim's freedom, leaving them feeling that they constantly have to be careful. In many cases, the conduct might appear innocent (if considered in isolation), but when carried out repeatedly, so as to amount to a course of conduct, it may then cause significant alarm, harassment or distress to the victim.

The examples given in section 2A (3) are not an exhaustive list but an indication of the types of behavior that may be displayed in a stalking offense.

Stalking and harassment of another or others can include a range of offenses such as those under the Protection from Harassment Act 1997; the Offences Against the Person Act 1861; the Sexual Offences Act 2003; and the Malicious Communications Act 1988.

Examples of the types of conduct often associated with stalking include direct communication; physical following; indirect contact through friends, colleagues, family or technology; or, other intrusions into the victim's privacy. The behavior curtails a victim's freedom, leaving them feeling that they constantly have to be careful.

If the subject of inquiry is aware of the tracking, then this may amount to harassment under the Prevention of Harassment Act 1997. There is a case at the Royal Courts of Justice where a private investigator is being sued under this act for the use of trackers. In December 2011, a Claim was brought against Richmond Day & Wilson Limited (First Defendant) and Bernard Matthews Limited (Second Defendant), Britain's leading Turkey Provider.

The case relates to the discovery of a tracking device found in August 2011 on a vehicle supposedly connected to Hillside Animal Sanctuary.

Regulation of Investigatory Powers Act 2000

Property Interference: The Home Office published a document entitled "Covert Surveillance and Property Interference, Revised Code of Practice, Pursuant to section 71 of the Regulation of Investigatory Powers Act 2000"  where it suggests in Chapter 7, page 61 that;

General basis for lawful activity

7. 1 Authorizations under section 5 of the 1994 Act or Part III of the 1997 Act should be sought wherever members of the intelligence services, the police, the services police, Serious and Organised Crime Agency (SOCA), Scottish Crime and Drug Enforcement Agency (SCDEA), HM Revenue and Customs (HMRC) or Office of Fair Trading (OFT), or persons acting on their behalf, conduct entry on, or interference with, property or with wireless telegraphy that would be otherwise unlawful.

7. 2 For the purposes of this chapter, "property interference" shall be taken to include entry on, or interference with, property or with wireless telegraphy.

Example: The use of a surveillance device for providing information about the location of a vehicle may involve some physical interference with that vehicle as well as subsequent directed surveillance activity. Such an operation could be authorized by a combined authorization for property interference (under Part III of the 1997 Act) and, where appropriate, directed surveillance (under the 2000 Act). In this case, the necessity and proportionality of the property interference element of the authorization would need to be considered by the appropriate authorizing officer separately to the necessity and proportionality of obtaining private information by means of the directed surveillance.

This can be interpreted to mean that placing a tracker on a vehicle without the consent of the owner is illegal unless you obtain authorization from the Surveillance Commissionaire under the RIPA 2000 laws. Since a member of the public cannot obtain such authorizations, it is therefore illegal property interference.

Another interpretation is that it is illegal to do so if you are acting under the instruction of a public authority and you do not obtain authorization. The legislation makes no mention of property interference for anyone else.

Currently, there is no legislation in place that deals with the deployment of trackers in a criminal sense except RIPA 2000 and that RIPA 2000 only applies to those agencies and persons mentioned in it.

Uses in marketing

In August 2010, Brazilian company Unilever ran an unusual promotion where GPS trackers were placed in boxes of Omo laundry detergent. Teams would then track consumers who purchased the boxes of detergent to their homes where they would be awarded a prize for their purchase. The company also launched a website (in Portuguese) to show the approximate location of the winners' homes.

See also

 Automatic Packet Reporting System
 Data privacy
 Electronic tagging
 GPS aircraft tracking
 GPS navigation device
 GPS tracking server
 GPS watch
 GPS wildlife tracking
 Intelligent transportation system (ITS)
 IVMS
 Mobile phone
 Radio clock#GPS clocks
 Real-time locating
 Telematics
 Telematics 2.0
 Vehicle infrastructure integration
 Vehicle tracking system

References

External links

Global Positioning System
Surveillance
Geopositioning
Navigational equipment

de:Track Log
fr:Géolocalisation